The femoral chordotonal organ is a group of mechanosensory neurons found in an insect leg (Figure 1) that detects the movements and the position of the femur/tibia joint. It is thought to function as a proprioceptor that is critical for precise control of leg position by sending the information regarding the femur/tibia joint to the motor circuits in the ventral nerve cord and the brain

Structure 
The cell bodies of the femoral chordotonal neurons are generally located in the proximal femur, and their dendrites are mechanically coupled to the tibia through different types of tendons. In Drosophila, where it is possible to genetically identify different subtypes of femoral chordotonal neurons, the neurons can be divided into three subtypes based on their axonal projection pattern into the ventral nerve cord (Figure 2). The axons of the club neurons project to the center of the ventral nerve cord and form a bundle that is shaped like a club. The axons of the claw neurons split into three branches that are shaped like a claw. The axons of the hook neurons are shaped similar to the peavey hook.

Sensory coding 

The sensory neurons of the femoral chordotonal organ encode various kinematic features of the femur/tibia joint including, position, speed, acceleration, and vibration. In Drosophila, where it is possible to genetically track different subtypes of femoral chordotonal neurons, it is known that these different kinematic features are encoded by anatomically distinct subtypes of neurons mentioned above (Figure 2). The position of the tibia is encoded by the claw neurons, vibrations are encoded by the club neurons, and the direction of the movement is encoded by the hook neurons.

Function 
The femoral chordotonal organ is thought to be involved in precise control of leg movements, and the experimental manipulations of the femoral chordotonal organ in stick insects and locusts have shown that they play a critical role during walking. and target reaching

One way in which the femoral chordotonal organ contributes to the control of leg movement is through a resistance reflex, in which a sub-group of femoral chordotonal neurons sense the extension of the tibia and activates the motor neurons that flexes tibia to counteract the movement. During walking, this stabilization reflex is reversed in order to promote the cyclic flexion and extension of the femur-tibia joint necessary for walking.

References 

Insect anatomy
Invertebrate nervous system